Triplophysa anterodorsalis is a species of stone loach in the genus Triplophysa. It is endemic to China.

References

A
Freshwater fish of China
Endemic fauna of China
Taxa named by Cao Wen-Xuan
Taxa named by Zhu Song-Quan
Fish described in 1989